Dimos Kokas (born 24 June 1997) is a Greek professional footballer who plays as a midfielder for Super League 2 club Panachaiki.

Personal life
Kokas’ twin brother, Andreas, is also a professional footballer.

References

1997 births
Footballers from Patras
Living people
Greek footballers
Greek expatriate footballers
Super League Greece 2 players
Cypriot Second Division players
Gamma Ethniki players
Olympiacos Volos F.C. players
Digenis Oroklinis players
Nafpaktiakos Asteras F.C. players
Panachaiki F.C. players
Association football midfielders